Muki may refer to:

Muki (jazz duo), an English acid jazz duo consisting of Luke Mullen and Jules Evans that released singles and albums from 1996 to 2000
Muki (Huancaya-Tomas), a mountain on the border of the districts of Huancaya and Tomas in the Yauyos Province, Lima Region, Peru
Muki (Lima), a mountain in the Tanta District, Yauyos Province, Lima Region, Peru
Muki (mythology), a mythological figure of the Andes
Muki (Oyón), a mountain in the Oyón Province, Lima Region, Peru
Muki (singer) or Daniel Niv or Mooke (sometimes styled as Mook D.) (born 1975), Israeli singer and rapper, best known as the frontman for successful Israeli hip hop/punk act Shabak Samech
Sagi Muki (born 1992), Israeli judoka